Shadian or Shadeyan or Shadiyan may refer to:

 Shadian, Afghanistan
 Shadian, Isfahan
 Shadian, Kerman
 Shadian District, Iran